The International Film Music Critics Association Award for Best Original Score for a Comedy Film is an annual award given by the International Film Music Critics Association, or the IFMCA. The award is given to the composer of a film score for a comedy film deemed to be the best in a given year. The award was first given in 1998, before going a six-year hiatus. It has been awards every year since 2004.

Winners and nominations

1990s

2000s

2010s

2020s

References

International Film Music Critics Association Awards